Sillapata District is one of nine districts of the province Dos de Mayo in Peru.

References